Antoine Raeymaeckers (born 4 April 1919) was a Belgian wrestler. He competed in the men's freestyle featherweight at the 1948 Summer Olympics.

References

External links
 

1919 births
Possibly living people
Belgian male sport wrestlers
Olympic wrestlers of Belgium
Wrestlers at the 1948 Summer Olympics
Sportspeople from Antwerp